Teka Mona! is a sketch comedy television show in the Philippines that airs every Saturday evenings on ABC. It was aired from July 29, 2006 to May 19, 2007.

Format
Teka Mona! features skits and sketches are performed in a manner similar to other variety shows, singing before the show ends, and Comedy Sequels.

Personalities
 Joey de Leon
 Mike Nacua
 Alyssa Alano
 Andrew Schimmer
 Coco Martin
 Andrea Torres
 Madz Aguilar

Comedy segments
 News Pollution: Balita Ngayon, Bukas Itatapon - It features news anchored by Susan Velasquez (Joey de Leon), a combined name of GMA reporter Susan Enriquez and ABS-CBN correspondent Tony Velasquez, and reported by Mike Kuliling (Mike Nacua) & Kissmee Bark Lee (Alyssa Alano).
 The Dirty Old Man - A segment with Filipino stories told by George Kulani (Joey De Leon), called by the Americans as George Clooney. Their topic is Alakubana, which means Alam kung bakit na.
 Ang Daming Daan - A parody of a popular religious program, Ang Dating Daan, interpreting some things. It is hosted by Bro. Elvis Soriano (Joey De Leon) and Brother Hud (Mike Nacua). Every time a person asks a question, he/she would pay .

Awards

See also
List of Philippine television shows
List of programs aired by TV5 (Philippine TV network)

References

2006 Philippine television series debuts
2007 Philippine television series endings
TV5 (Philippine TV network) original programming
Philippine comedy television series
Filipino-language television shows